Pavlo Oleksandrovych Yakovenko – or Pavel Aleksandrovich Yakovenko (born 19 December 1964 in Nikopol, Ukrainian SSR), is a former Ukrainian footballer and USSR international.

Personal life 
He is the father of the Ukrainian footballers Oleksandr Yakovenko and Yuriy Yakovenko.

Playing career
Yakovenko's superb build-up play during the mid-1980s made him the starting midfielder for both Dynamo Kyiv and the USSR national football team during their respective successful campaigns of winning the UEFA Cup Winners' Cup and advancing to the top 16 in the 1986 FIFA World Cup. However, recurrent injuries had limited Yakovenko's playing time after 1987 and Yakovenko never returned to his earlier form, becoming a bench player at best.

In 1983, Yakovenko took part in the Summer Spartakiad of the Peoples of the USSR in the team of Ukrainian SSR.

International

International goals

Coaching career
He is a trusted Ukrainian coach who headed the Ukraine under-21 team on several occasions as well as other teams representing the country on the international arena. Yakovenko also coached several teams from the southern regions of the neighbouring Russian Federation such as Kuban Krasnodar and FC Rostov.

Ballon d'Or
1986 – 21st

References

External links

 

1964 births
Living people
People from Nikopol, Ukraine
Ukrainian footballers
Ukrainian expatriate footballers
Ukrainian football managers
FC Metalist Kharkiv players
FC Dynamo Kyiv players
FC Sochaux-Montbéliard players
Soviet footballers
Soviet Union international footballers
1986 FIFA World Cup players
Expatriate footballers in France
Soviet Top League players
Soviet First League players
Ukrainian Premier League players
Ligue 1 players
Championnat National players
Championnat National 2 players
FC Elektrometalurh Nikopol managers
FC Elista managers
FC Borysfen-2 Boryspil managers
FC Khimki managers
FC Kuban Krasnodar managers
FC Rostov managers
Ukrainian First League managers
Ukrainian Second League managers
Russian First League managers
Russian Premier League managers
Expatriate football managers in Russia
Ukrainian expatriate football managers
Ukrainian expatriate sportspeople in Russia
Ukrainian expatriate sportspeople in France
Ukraine national under-21 football team managers
FC Obolon Kyiv managers
Association football midfielders
Recipients of the Order of Merit (Ukraine), 2nd class
Sportspeople from Dnipropetrovsk Oblast